The Arbuthnot and Ambrister incident occurred in 1818 during the First Seminole War. American General Andrew Jackson invaded Spanish Florida and captured and executed Alexander George Arbuthnot and Robert C. Ambrister, two British citizens charged with aiding Seminole and Creek Indians against the United States. Arbuthnot and Ambrister were tried and executed in modern Bay County, Florida, near what continues to be called Court Martial Lake, near Sand Hills. Jackson's actions triggered short-lived protests from the British and Spanish governments and an investigation by the United States Congress. Congressional reports found fault with Jackson's handling of the trial and execution of Arbuthnot and Ambrister, but Congress chose not to censure the popular general.

Robert Chrystie Ambrister (1797–1818) was a British citizen and a native of Nassau, Bahamas. Ambrister had served in the Royal Navy as a volunteer and as a midshipman between 1809 and 1813, when he returned to the Bahamas. During 1814–1815, he served in Spanish Florida as an auxiliary 2nd lieutenant of the British Corps of Colonial Marines, commanded by Brevet Major Edward Nicolls of the Royal Marines. Discharged from the military in Nassau in 1815, the former Marine lieutenant returned to Spanish Florida in 1817 with his fellow former Marine, Brevet Captain George Woodbine, and the Scottish soldier of fortune Gregor MacGregor.

Alexander (George) Arbuthnot was an older man, a Scottish merchant, translator, and diplomatic go-between, on occasion, who had been present in Florida since 1803. Jackson's execution of Arbuthnot, Ambrister, and at least two prominent Creek-Seminole leaders (Josiah Francis and Hoemotchernucho) was perceived, both in Great Britain and elsewhere, as an act of barbarity violating the conventions of warfare.

A decade later in 1828, Jackson was elected president of the United States.

References

Further reading
 Aubigné, Guillaume Merle d'; Chinard, Gilbert. 1935. La vie américaine de Guillaume Merle d'Aubigné; extraits de son journal de voyage et de sa correspondence inédite, 1809-1817, Paris, E. Droz; Baltimore, Johns Hopkins Press.  - pp. 133–147.
 Gales, Joseph. 1834–1856. The debates and proceedings in the Congress of the United States; with an appendix containing important state papers and public documents, and all the laws of a public nature; Washington, Gales and Seaton.  - "Seminole War", pp. 367–374.
Fisher, Louis. "Military Tribunals: Historical Patterns and Lessons". Congressional Research Service Report for Congress, 2004.
Foreign Office. British and foreign state papers Volume 6, 1818-1819. Piccadilly, London: James Ridgway, 1835. 
Heidler, David and Jeanne Heidler. Old Hickory's War: Andrew Jackson and the Quest for Empire. Mechanicsburg, Pennsylvania: Stackpole Books, 1996. .
 Hoefer, Jean Chrétien Ferdinand. 1862. Nouvelle biographie générale depuis les temps les plus reculés jusqu'à nos jours, Paris : Didot.  - pp. 153–154
Narrative of a voyage to the Spanish Main in the ship "Two Friends;" the occupation of Amelia island by McGregor, etc.--sketches of the province of East Florida; and anecdotes illustrative of the habits and manners of the Seminole Indians: with an appendix containing a detail of the Seminole war, and the execution of Arbuthnot and Ambrister, London, Printed for J. Miller, 1819.  - pp. 196–312.
 
Remini, Robert V. Andrew Jackson and his Indian Wars. New York: Viking, 2001. .
Rush, Richard. 1845. Memoranda of a residence at the court of London comprising incidents official and personal from 1819-1825, including negotiations on the Oregon question, and other unsettled questions between the United States and Great Britain, Philadelphia : Lea & Blanchard.  - Chapters iv & v.
Wright, J. Leitch, Jr. "A Note on the First Seminole War as Seen by the Indians, Negroes, and Their British Advisers". The Journal of Southern History 34, no. 4 (November 1968), 565–575.

1818 crimes in North America
19th-century executions by the United States
Andrew Jackson
Diplomatic incidents
Seminole Wars
Spain–United States relations
Year of birth unknown
United Kingdom–United States relations
1818 in North America
1818 in international relations
1818 in New Spain
April 1818 events